Landshut Bridge is a road bridge in Elgin, Moray, Scotland which crosses the River Lossie.

The bridge is named after Landshut in Bavaria, Germany, a twin town of Elgin.

History 

The bridge was designed as part of the Elgin Flood Alleviation Scheme as a replacement for Pansport Bridge, which was in the same location. Landshut Bridge is longer and has an additional span in order to cross a second channel of the River Lossie added as part of the flood alleviation project.

Construction began in 2011. A temporary bridge was installed adjacent to the construction site to allow Pansport Bridge to be demolished and Landshut Bridge to be constructed. The bridge was completed in July 2014.

Design 
The deck is cable-suspended. The main contractor was Morrison Construction and the steelwork was erected by the Cleveland Bridge & Engineering Company.

References 

Bridges completed in 2014
Transport in Moray
Elgin, Moray
Bridges across the River Lossie
Road bridges in Scotland